A road movie is a film genre in which the main characters leave home on a road trip, typically altering the perspective from their everyday lives. Road movies often depict travel in the hinterlands, with the films exploring the theme of alienation and examining the tensions and issues of the cultural identity of a nation or historical period; this is all often enmeshed in a mood of actual or potential menace, lawlessness, and violence, a "distinctly existential air" and is populated by restless, "frustrated, often desperate characters". The setting includes not just the close confines of the car as it moves on highways and roads, but also booths in diners and rooms in roadside motels, all of which helps to create intimacy and tension between the characters. Road movies tend to focus on the theme of masculinity (with the man often going through some type of crisis), some type of rebellion, car culture, and self-discovery. The core theme of road movies is "rebellion against conservative social norms".

There are two main narratives: the quest and the outlaw chase. In the quest-style film, the story meanders as the characters make discoveries (e.g., Two-Lane Blacktop from 1971). In outlaw road movies, in which the characters are fleeing from law enforcement, there is usually more sex and violence (e.g., Natural Born Killers from 1994). Road films tend to focus more on characters' internal conflicts and transformations, based on their feelings as they experience new realities on their trip, rather than on the dramatic movement-based sequences that predominate in action films. Road movies do not typically use the standard three-act structure used in mainstream films; instead, an "open-ended, rambling plot structure" is used.

The road movie keeps its characters "on the move", and as such the "car, the tracking shot, [and] wide and wild open space" are important iconography elements, similar to a Western movie. As well, the road movie is similar to a Western in that road films are also about a "frontiersmanship" and about the codes of discovery (often self-discovery). Road movies often use the music from the car stereo, which the characters are listening to, as the soundtrack and in 1960s and 1970s road movies, rock music is often used (e.g., Easy Rider from 1969 used a rock soundtrack  of songs from Jimi Hendrix, The Byrds and Steppenwolf).

While early road movies from the 1930s focused on heterosexual couples, in post-World War II films, usually the travellers are male buddies, although in some cases, women are depicted on the road, either as temporary companions, or more rarely, as the protagonist couple (e.g., Thelma & Louise from 1991). The genre can also be parodied, or have protagonists that depart from the typical heterosexual couple or buddy paradigm, as with The Adventures of Priscilla, Queen of the Desert (1994), which depicts a group of drag queens who tour the Australian desert. Other examples of the increasing diversity of the drivers shown in 1990s and subsequent decades' road films are The Living End (1992), about two gay, HIV-positive men on a road trip; To Wong Foo, Thanks for Everything! Julie Newmar (1995), which is about drag queens, and Smoke Signals (1998), which is about two Indigenous men. While rare, there are some road movies about large groups on the road (Get on the Bus from 1996) and lone drivers (Vanishing Point from 1971).

Genre and production elements 
The road movie has been called an elusive and ambiguous film genre. Timothy Corrigan states that road movies are a "knowingly impure" genre as they have "overdetermined and built-in genre-blending tendencies". Devin Orgeron states that road movies, despite their literal focus on car trips, are "about the [history of] the cinema, about the culture of the image", with road movies created with a mixture of Classical Hollywood film genres. The road movie genre developed from a "constellation of “solid” modernity, combining locomotion and media-motion" to get "away from the sedentarising forces of modernity and produc[e] contingency".

Road movies are blended with other genres to create a number of subgenres, including: road horror (e.g., Near Dark from 1987); road comedies (e.g., Flirting with Disaster from 1996); road racing films (e.g., Death Race 2000 from 1975) and rock concert tour films (e.g., Almost Famous from 2000). Film noir road movies include Detour (1945), Desperate, The Devil Thumbs a Ride (1947) and The Hitch-Hiker (1953), all of which "establish fear and suspense around hitchhiking", and the outlaw-themed film noirs They Live by Night (1948) and Gun Crazy. Film noir-influenced road films continued in the neo noir era, with The Hitcher (1986), Delusion (1991), Red Rock West (1992), and Joy Ride (2001).

Even though road movies are a significant and popular genre, it is an "overlooked strain of film history". Major genre studies often do not examine road movies, and there has been little analysis of what qualifies as a road movie.

Country or region of production

United States 
The road movie is mostly associated with the United States, as it focuses on "peculiarly American dreams, tensions and anxieties". US road movies examine the tension between the two foundational myths of American culture, which are individualism and populism, which leads to some road films depicting the open road as a "utopian fantasy" with a homogenous culture while others show it as a "dystopian nightmare" of extreme cultural differences. US road movies depict the wide open, vast spaces of the highways as symbolizing the "scale and notionally utopian" opportunities to move up upwards and outwards in life.

In US road movies, the road is an "alternative space" where the characters, now set apart from conventional society, can experience transformation. For example, in It Happened One Night (1934), a wealthy woman who goes on the road is liberated from her elite background and marriage to an immoral husband when she meets and experiences hospitality from regular, good-hearted Americans who she never would have met in her previous life, with middle America depicted as a utopia of "real community". The scenes in road movies tend to elicit longing for a mythic past.

American road movies have tended to be a white genre, with Spike Lee's Get on the Bus (1996) being a notable exception, as its main characters are African-American men on a bus travelling to the Million Man March (the film depicts the historic role of buses in the US civil rights movement). Asian-American filmmakers have used the road movie to examine the role and treatment of Asian-Americans in the United States; examples include Wayne Wang's Chan Is Missing (1982), about a taxi driver trying to find about the Hollywood detective character Charlie Chan, and Abraham Lim's Roads and Bridges (2001), about an Asian-American prisoner who is sentenced to clean up garbage along a Midwestern highway.

Australia 
Australia's vast open spaces and concentrated population have made the road movie a key genre in that country, with films such as George Miller's Mad Max films, which were rooted in an Australian tradition for films with "dystopian and noir themes with the destructive power of cars and the country’s harsh, sparsely populated land mass". Australian road movies have been described as having a dystopian or gothic tone, as the road the characters travel on is often a "dead end", with the journey being more about "inward-looking" exploration than reaching the intended location.  In Australia, road movies have been called a "complex metaphor" which refers to the country's history, current situation, and to anxieties about the future. 
The Mad Max films, including Mad Max, The Road Warrior and Mad Max Beyond Thunderdome, "have become canonical for their dystopic reinvention of the outback as a post-human wasteland where survival depends upon manic driving skills".

Other Australian road movies include Peter Weir's The Cars That Ate Paris (1974), about a small town where the inhabitants cause road accidents to salvage the vehicles; the biker film Stone (1974) by Sandy Harbutt, about a biker gang who witness a political cover-up murder; The (1981) thriller Roadgames by Richard Franklin, about a truck driver who tracks down a serial killer in the Australian outback; Dead-end Drive-in (1986) by Brian Trenchard-Smith, about a dystopian future where drive-in theatres are turned into detention centres; Metal Skin (1994) by Geoffrey Wright about a street racer; and Kiss or Kill (1997) by Bill Bennett, a film noir-style road movie.

The Adventures of Priscilla, Queen of the Desert (1994) has been called a "watershed gay road movie that addresses diversity in Australia". Walkabout (1971), Backroads (1977), and Rabbit-Proof Fence (2002) use a depiction of travelling through the Australian outback to address the issue of relations between white and Indigenous people.

In 2005, Fiona Probyn described a subgenre of road movies about Indigenous Australians that she called "No Road" movies, in that they typically do not show a vehicle travelling on an asphalt road; instead, these films depict travel on a trail, often with Indigenous trackers being shown using their tracking abilities to discern hard-to-detect clues on the trail. With the increasing depiction of racial minorities in Australian road movies, the "No Road" subgenre has also been associated with Asian-Australian films that depict travel using routes other than roads (e.g., the 2010 film Mother Fish, which depicts travel over water as it tells the story of the boat people refugees). The iconography of car crashes in many Australian road movies (particularly the Mad Max series) has been called a symbol of white-Indigenous violence, a rupture point in the narrative which erases and forgets the history of this violence.

Canada 
Canada also has huge expanses of territory, which make the road movie also common in that country, where the genre is used to examine "themes of alienation and isolation in relation to an expansive, almost foreboding landscape of seemingly endless space", and explore how Canadian identity differs from the "less humble and self-conscious neighbours to the south", in United States. Canadian road films include Donald Shebib's Goin' Down the Road (1970), three Bruce McDonald films (Roadkill (1989), Highway 61 (1991), and Hard Core Logo (1996), a mockumentary about a punk rock band's road tour), Malcolm Ingram's Tail Lights Fade (1999) and Gary Burns' The Suburbanators (1995). David Cronenberg's Crash (1996) depicted drivers who get "perverse sexual arousal through the car crash experience", a subject matter which led to Ted Turner lobbying against the film being shown in US theatres.

Asian-Canadian filmmakers have made road films about the experience of Canadians of Asian origin, such as Ann Marie Fleming's The Magical Life of Long Tak Sam, which is about her search for her "Chinese grandfather, an itinerant magician and acrobat". Other Asian-Canadian road movies look at their relatives experiences during the 1940s internment of Japanese Canadians by the Canadian government (e.g., Lise Yasui's Family Gathering (1988), Rea Tajiri's History and Memory (1991) and Janet Tanaka's Memories from the Department of Amnesia (1991).

Europe 
European filmmakers of road movies appropriate the conventions established by American directors, while at the same time reformulating these approaches, by de-emphasizing the speed of the driver on the road, increasing the amount of introspection (often on themes such as national identity), and depicting the road trip as a search on the part of the characters.

The German filmmaker Wim Wenders explored the American themes of road movies through his European reference point in his Road Movie trilogy  in the mid-1970s. They include Alice in the Cities (1974), The Wrong Move (1975), and Kings of the Road (1976).  All three films were shot by cinematographer Robby Müller and mostly take place in West Germany. Kings of the Road includes stillness, which is unusual for road movies, and quietness (except for the rock soundtrack). Other road movies by Wenders include Paris, Texas and Until the End of the World. Wender's road movies "filter nomadic excursions through a pensive Germanic lens" and depict "somber drifters coming to terms with their internal scars".

France has a road movie tradition than stretches from Bertrand Blier's Les Valseuses (1973) and Agnès Varda's Sans toit ni loi (about a homeless woman) to 1990s films such as Merci la vie (1991) and Virginie Despentes and Coralie Trinh Thi's Baise-moi (a controversial film about two women revenging a rape), to 2000s films such as Laurent Cantet's L'emploi du temps (2001) and Cédric Kahn's Feux rouges (2004). While French road movies share the US road movie's focus on the theme of individual freedom, French movies also balance this value with equality and fraternity, according to the French Republican model of liberty-equality-fraternity.

Neil Archer states that French and other Francophone (e.g., Belgium, Switzerland) road films focus on "displacement and identity", notably in regards to maghrebin immigrants and young people (e.g., Yamina Benguigui's Inch'Allah Dimanche (2001), Ismaël Ferroukhi's La Fille de Keltoum (2001) and Tony Gatlif's Exils (2004). More broadly, European films are tending to use imagery of border-crossing and focusing on "marginal identities and economic migration", which can be seen in Lukas Moodysson's Lilja 4-ever (2002), Michael Winterbottom's In This World (2002) and Ulrich Seidl's Import/Export (2007). European road movies also examine post-colonialism, "disclocation, memory and identity".

Road movies from Spain have a strong American influence, with the films incorporating the road movie-comedy genre hybrid made popular in US films such as Peter Farrelly's Dumb and Dumber (1994). Spanish films including Los anos barbaros, Carretera y manta, Trileros, Al final del Camino, and Airbag, which has been called the "most successful Spanish road movie of all time". Airbag, along with Slam (2003), El mundo alrededor (2006) and Los managers, are examples of Spanish road films that, like US movies such as Road Trip, uses the "road movie genre as a narrative framework for...gross-out sex comedy". The director of Airbag, Juanma Bajo Ulloa, states that he aimed to make fun of the road movie genre as established in North America, while still using the metamorphosis through road trip narrative that is popular in the genre (in this case, the main male character rejects his upper class girlfriend in favour of a prostitute he meets on the road). Airbag also uses Spanish equivalents to the stock road movie setting and iconography, depicting "deserts, casinos and road clubs" and use the road movie action sequences (chases, car explosions, and crashes) that remind the viewer of similar work by Tony Scott and Oliver Stone.

A second subtype of Spanish road movies is more influenced by the female road movies from the US, such as Martin Scorsese's Alice Doesn't Live Here Anymore (1974), Jonathan Demme's Crazy Mama (1975), Ridley Scott's Thelma & Louise (1991), and Herbert Ross' Boys on the Side (1995), in that they show a "less traditional" and more "visible, innovative, introspective, and realistic" type of woman onscreen. Spanish road movies about women include Hola, estas, sola, Lisboa, Fugitivas, Retorno a Hansala, and Sin Dejar Huella address social issues about women, such as the "injustice and mistreatment" that women experience under "authoritarian patriarchal order." Fugitivas depicts an American road movie genre convention: the "disintegration of the family and the community" and the "journey of transformation", as it depicts two fugitives on the run, whose distrust fades as the two women learn to trust each other from their adventures on the road. The images in the film are blend of homage to US road movie conventions (gas stations, billboards) and "recognizable Spanish types", such as the "embittered drunkard".

Other European road films include Ingmar Bergman's Wild Strawberries (1957), about an old professor travelling the roads of Sweden and picking up hitchhikers and Jean-Luc Godard's Pierrot le fou (1965) about law-breaking lovers escaping on the road. Both of these films, as well as Roberto Rossellini's Voyage in Italy (1953) and Godard's Weekend (1967) have more "existential sensibility" or pauses for "philosophical digressions of a European bent", as compared with American road films. Three Men and a Leg (1997) features several sketches from filmmakers and producers' Aldo, Giovanni & Giacomo's previous comedy productions overlaid with the rest of the movie's road-trip and romantic comedy atmosphere. Other European road films include Chris Petit's Radio On (1979), a Wim Wenders-influenced film set on the M4 motorway; Aki Kaurismäki's Leningrad Cowboys Go America ( 1989), about a fictional Russian rock band which travels to the US; and Theo Angelopoulos' Landscape in the Mist, about a road trip from Greece to Germany.

Latin America 
Road movies made in Latin America are similar in feel to European road films. Latin American road movies are usually about a cast of characters, rather than a couple or single person, and the films explore the differences between urban and rural regions and between north and south. Luis Buñuel's Subida al Cielo (Mexican Bus Ride, 1951), is about a poor rural person's trip into a big city to help his mother, who is dying. The road trip on this film is shown as a "carnivalesque pilgrimage" or "travelling circus", an approach also used in Bye Bye Brazil (1979, Brazil), Guantanamera (1995, Cuba), and Central do Brasil (Central Station, 1998, Brazil). Some Latin American road movies are also set in the era of conquest, such as Cabeza de Vaca (1991, Mexico). Movies about outlaws escaping from justice include Profundo Carmesí (Deep Crimson, 1996, Mexico) and El Camino (The Road, 2000, Argentina).  Y tu mamá también (And Your Mother Too, 2001, Mexico) is about two young male buddies who have sexual adventures on the road.

Russia and countries of the former USSR 
Movies involving road movie genre while being rejected by mainstream media, gained huge popularity in Russian art cinema and surrounding post-Soviet cultures, slowly building their way into international film festivals. Well-known examples are My Joy (2010), Bummer (2003), Major (2013), and How Vitka Chesnok Took Lyokha Shtyr to the Home for Invalids (2017). Some other movies incorporate a large portion of road movie style, for example Morphine (2008), Leviathan (2014), Cargo 200 (2007), Donbass (2018).

With themes ranging from crime, corruption and power to history, addiction and existence, road movies became an independent part of cinematic landscape. From the strong flow of existentialism, to the black comedy style, the road movie experienced a new revival. Most precious are pieces from Sergei Loznitsa, in his early work My Joy (2010) he used black noir style to tell the story of people falling together with destruction of governments after the fall of the Soviet Union. In his later work Donbass (2018), he takes an opposing style, turning to black comedy and satire to underline actual war tragedies in the Russo-Ukrainian War.

India

Indian screens saw a series of road movies with experimental filmmaker Ram Gopal Varma's works such as Kshana Kshanam. Rachel Dwyer, a reader in world cinema at the University of London-Department of South Asia, marked Varma's contribution into the new-age film noir. The film received critical reception at the Ann Arbor Film Festival, which led to a series of genre-benders like Mani Ratnam's Thiruda Thiruda, and Varma's Daud, Anaganaga Oka Roju and Road. Subsequently 21st century bollywood movies witnessed a surge of motion-pictures such as Road, Movie, nominated for the Tokyo Sakura Grand Prix Award, the Tribeca Film Festival, and the Generation 14plus at the 60th Berlin International Film Festival in 2010. Liars Dice explores the story of a young mother from a remote village who, going in search of her missing husband, goes missing, the film examines the human cost of migration to cities and the exploitation of migrant workers. It was India's Official Entry for the Best Foreign Language Film for the 87th Academy Awards. It won special prize at Sofia International Film Festival. In Karwaan, the protagonist is forced to set out on a road trip from Bengaluru to Kochi after he loses his father in an accident, but the body delivered to him is of the mother of a woman in another state.

Ryan Gilbey of The Guardian was broadly positive about Zoya Akhtar's Zindagi Na Milegi Dobara; he wrote, "It's still playing to full houses, and you can see why. Slick it may be. But tourist board employees representing the various Spanish cities flattered in the movie are not the only ones who will come out grinning", and that he found the movie "stubbornly un-macho" for a buddy film. Piku tells the story of the short-tempered Piku Banerjee (Deepika Padukone), her grumpy, aging father Bhashkor (Amitabh Bachchan) and Rana Chaudhary (Irrfan Khan), who is stuck between the father-daughter duo, as they embark on a journey from Delhi to Kolkata. In Nagesh Kukunoor's children's film Dhanak a blind kid and his sister set off alone on a 300 km journey traversing testing Indian terrain from Jaislamer to Jodhpur, the film won the Crystal Bear Grand Prix for Best Children's Film, and Special Mention for the Best Feature Film by The Children's Jury for Generation Kplus at the 65th Berlin International Film Festival Finding Fanny is based on a road trip set in Goa and follows the journey of five dysfunctional friends who set out on a road trip in search of Fanny. The Good Road is told in a hyperlink format, where several stories are intertwined, with the center of the action being a highway in the rural lands of Gujarat near a town in Kutch.

Africa
Several road movies have been produced in Africa, including Cocorico! Monsieur Poulet (1977, Niger); The Train of Salt and Sugar (2016, Mozambique); Hayat (2016, Morocco); Touki Bouki (1973, Senegal) and Borders (2017, Burkina Faso).

History 

The genre has its roots in spoken and written tales of epic journeys, such as the Odyssey and the Aeneid. The road film is a standard plot employed by screenwriters. It is a type of bildungsroman, a story in which the hero changes, grows or improves over the course of the story. It focuses more on the journey rather than the goal. David Laderman lists other literary influences on the road movie, such as Don Quixote (1615), which uses a description of a journey to create social satire; The Adventures of Huckleberry Finn (1884), a story about a journey down the Mississippi River that is full of social commentary; Heart of Darkness (1902), about a journey down a river in the Belgian Congo to search for a rogue colonial trader; and Women in Love (1920), which describes "travel and mobility" while also providing social commentary about the woes of industrialization. Laderman states that Women in Love particularly lays the groundwork for the future road films, as it showed a couple who rebelled against social norms by leaving their familiar location and going on an aimless, meandering journey.

Steinbeck's novel The Grapes of Wrath (1939) depicts a family that struggles to survive on the road during the Great Depression, a book that has been called "America's best-known proletarian road saga". The movie version of the novel, made a year later, depicts the hungry, weary family's travel on Route 66 using "montage sequences, reflected images of the road on windshields and mirrors", and shots taken from the driver's point of view to create a sense of movement and place. Even though Henry Miller's The Air-Conditioned Nightmare (1947) is not a fictional work, it captures the mood of frustration, restlessness and aimlessness that became prevalent in the road movie. In the book, which describe's Miller's cross-country journey across the United States, he criticizes the nation's descent into materialism.

Western films such as John Ford's Stagecoach (1939) have been called "proto-road movies." In the film, an unusual group of travellers, including a banker, prostitute, escaped prisoner and a military officer's wife, move through the dangerous desert trails. Even though the travellers are so unlike each other, the mutual danger they must face in travelling through Geronimo's Apache territory requires them to work together to create a "utopia of...community". The difference between older stories about wandering characters and the road movie is technological: with road movies, the hero travels by car, motorcycle, bus or train, making road movies a representation of modernity's advantages and social ills. The on-the-road plot was used at the birth of American cinema but blossomed in the years after World War II, reflecting a boom in automobile production and the growth of youth culture. Early road movies have been criticized for their "casual misogyny", "fear of otherness", and for not examining issues such as power, privilege, and gender  and for mostly showing white people.

The road movie of the pre-WW II era was changed by the publication of Jack Kerouac's On the Road in 1957, as it sketched out the future for the road movie and provided its "master narrative" of exploration, questing, and journeying. The book includes many descriptions of driving in cars. It also depicted the character Sal Paradise, a middle class college student who goes on the road to seek material for his writing career, a bounded journey with a clear start and finish which differs from the open ended wandering of previous films, with characters making chance encounters with other drivers who influence where one travels or ends up. To contrast the intellectual Sal character, Kerouac has the juvenile delinquent Dean, a wild, fast-driving character who represents the idea that the road provides liberation.

By depicting a movie character who was marginalized and who could not be incorporated into mainstream American culture, Kerouac opened the way for road movies to depict a more diverse range of characters, rather than just heterosexual couples (e.g., It Happened One Night), groups on the move (e.g., The Grapes of Wrath), notably the pair of male buddies. On the Road and another novel published in the same era, Vladimir Nabokov's novel Lolita (1955), have been called "two monumental road novels that rip back and forth across American with a subversive erotic charge."

In the 1950s, there were "wholesome" road comedies such as Bob Hope and Bing Crosby's Road to Bali (1952), Vincente Minnelli's The Long, Long Trailer (1954) and the Dean Martin and Jerry Lewis film Hollywood or Bust (1956). There were not many 1950s road films, but "postwar youth culture" was depicted in The Wild One (1953) and Rebel Without a Cause (1955).

Timothy Corrigan states that post-WW II, the genre of road films became more codified, with features solidifying such as the use of characters experiencing "amnesia, hallucinations and theatrical crisis". David Laderman states that road movies have a modernist aesthetic approach, as they focus on "rebellion, social criticism, and liberating thrills", which shows "disillusionment" with mainstream political and aesthetic norms. Awareness of the "road picture" as a separate genre came only in the 1960s with Bonnie and Clyde and Easy Rider. Road movies were an important genre in the late 1960s and 1970s era of the New Hollywood, with films such as Terrence Malick's Badlands and Richard Sarafian's Vanishing Point (1971) showing an influence from Bonnie and Clyde.

There may have been influences from French cinema in the creation of Bonnie and Clyde; David Newman and Robert Benton have stated that they were influenced by Jean-Luc Godard's A bout de souffle (1960) and François Truffaut's Tirez sur la pianiste (1960). More generally, Devin Orgeron states that American road movies were based on post-WW II European cinema's own take on the American road film approach, showing a mutual influence between US and European filmmakers in this genre.

The addition of violence to the sexual tension of road movies in the late 1960s and in subsequent decades can be seen as a way to create more excitement and "frisson". From the 1930s to 1960s, merely showing a man and woman on a road trip was exciting for audience, as all the motel stays and closeness had implied, yet deferred, consummation of the sexual attraction between the characters (sex could not be depicted due to the Motion Picture Production Code). With Bonnie and Clyde (1967) and Natural Born Killers (1994), the heterosexual couple are united by their involvement in murder; as well, with jail hanging over their heads, there can be no return to domestic life at the end of the film.

There have been three historical eras of the "outlaw-rebel" road movie: the post-WW II film noir era (e.g., Detour), the late 1960s era which was rocked by the Vietnam War (Easy Rider and Bonnie and Clyde), and the post-Reagan era of the 1990s, when the "masculinist heroics of the Gulf War gave way to closer scrutiny" (My Own Private Idaho, Thelma & Louise and Natural Born Killers). In the 1970s, there were low-budget outlaw films depicting chases, such as Eddie Macon's Run. In the 1980s, there were rural Southern road movies such as Smokey and the Bandit and the Cannonball Run chase films of 1981 and 1984. The outlaw couple movie was reinvented in the 1990s with a postmodernist take in films such as Wild at Heart, Kalifornia and True Romance.

While the first road movies described the discovery of new territories or pushing the boundaries of a nation, which was a core message of early Western films in the United States, road movies were later used to show how national identities were changing, such as which Edgar G. Ulmer’s Detour (1945), a film noir about a musician travelling from New York City to Hollywood who sees a nation absorbed by greed, or Dennis Hopper’s Easy Rider, which showed how American society was transformed by the social and cultural trends of the late 1960s. The New Hollywood era films made use of the new film technologies in the road movie genre, such as "fast film stock" and lightweight cameras, as well as incorporating filmmaking approaches from European cinema, such as "elliptical narrative structure and self-reflexive devices, elusive development of alienated characters; bold traveling shots and montage sequences.

Road movies have been called a post-WW II genre, as they track key post-war cultural trends, such as the breakup of the traditional family structure, in which male roles were destabilized; there is focus on menacing events which impact the characters who are on the move; there is an association between the character and the mode of transportation being used (e.g., a car or motorcycle), with the car symbolizing the self in the modern culture; and there is usually a focus on men, with women typically being excluded, creating a "male escapist fantasy linking masculinity to technology". Despite these examples of the post-WW II aspects of road movies, Cohan and Hark argue that road movies go back to the 1930s.

In the 2000s, a new crop of road movies was produced, including Vincent Gallo's Brown Bunny (2003), Alexander Payne's Sideways (2004), Jim Jarmusch's Broken Flowers (2005) and Kelly Reichardt's Old Joy (2006) and scholars are taking more interest in examining the genre. The British Film Institute highlights ten post-2000 road films that show that "[t]here’s still plenty of gas left in the road movie genre". The BFI's top 10 include Andrea Arnold’s American Honey (2016), which used "mostly non-professional actors"; Alfonso Cuarón's Y tu mamá también (2001), about Mexican teens on the road; The Brown Bunny (2003), which garnered publicity for its "infamous fellatio scene"; Walter Salles' The Motorcycle Diaries (2004), about Che Guevera's epic motorcycle trip; Mark Duplass and Jay Duplass' The Puffy Chair (2005), the "first mumblecore road movie"; Broken Flowers (2005); Jonathan Dayton and Valerie Faris' Little Miss Sunshine (2006), about a family's trip in a VW camper van; Old Joy (2006); Alexander Payne's Nebraska (2013), which depicts a father and son on a road trip; Steven Knight's Locke (2013), about a construction executive taking stressful calls on a road trip; and Jafar Panahi's Taxi Tehran (2015), about a cab driver ferrying strange passengers around the city.
Timothy Corrigan has called the postmodern road movie a "borderless refuse bin" of "mise en abyme" reflection, reflecting a modern audience that is not able to think of a "naturalized history". Atkinson calls contemporary road movies an "ideogram of human desire and a last-ditch search for self" designed for an audience that was raised watching TV, particularly open-ended serial programs.

Movies of this genre 

Note, that the Country column is the country of origin and/or financing, and does not necessarily represent the country or countries depicted in each film.

See also 

Monomyth

References

Further reading 

Atkinson, Michael. "Crossing the frontiers." Sight & Sound vol IV number 1 (Jan 1994); p 14-17
Dargis, Manohla. "Roads to freedom." (history and analysis of road movies ) Sight and Sound July 1991 vol 1 number 3 p. 14
 
Ireland, Brian. "American Highways: Recurring Images and Themes of the Road Genre." The Journal of American Culture 26:4 (December 2003) p. 474-484
Laderman, David. Driving visions : exploring the road movie. Austin : University of Texas Press, 2002.
Lang, Robert. "My own private Idaho and the new new queer road movies." New York : Columbia University Press, c2002.
Mazierska, Ewa and Rascaroli, Laura. Crossing New Europe. Postmodern Travel and the European Road Movie. London, Wallflower, 2006. 
Morris, Christopher. "The Reflexivity of the Road Film." Film Criticism vol. 28 no. 1 (Fall 2003) p. 24-52
Orgeron, Devin. Road movies : from Muybridge and Méliès to Lynch and Kiarostami. New York : Palgrave Macmillan, 2008.
Lie, Nadia. (2017). The Latin American (Counter-) Road Movie and Ambivalent Modernity. New York: Palgrave-Macmillan.  This book offers a critical survey of the Latin American road film genre through an analysis covering over 160 films.
Luckman, Susan. "Road Movies, National Myths and the Threat of the Road: The Shifting Transformative Space of the Road in Australian Film." International Journal of the Humanities; 2010, Vol. 8 Issue 1, p. 113–125.
Mills, Katie. "Road Film Rising: Hells Angels, Merry Pranksters, and Easy Rider." The road story and the rebel : moving through film, fiction, and television. Carbondale : Southern Illinois University Press, 2006.
 This book collects 16 essays on road movies.

External links 
 Road Movie Filmography at University of California, Berkeley

Film genres
 
Transport films